Isostola nigrivenata is a moth of the family Erebidae. It was described by Hering in 1925. It is found in Colombia and Costa Rica.

References

Arctiinae
Moths described in 1925